Cromwell Crossroads is an unincorporated community located in Wayne County, Tennessee.

Economy
Cromwell Crossroads has an agricultural economy.  There are a few Businesses located in  Cromwell Crossroads which are listed below:
Crossroads General Store and Café
Bear Creek Country Cookin
Bear Creek Tire Shop

Highways
 Tennessee State Route 203

References

Unincorporated communities in Wayne County, Tennessee
Unincorporated communities in Tennessee